Lakeway (foaled February 19, 1991 in Kentucky) is an American Thoroughbred racehorse who in six starts in 1994 for trainer Gary Jones won four Grade I stakes and was second in two others.

Racing
Bred and raced by Michael G. Rutherford, Lakeway was out of the mare Milliardaire, a daughter of Hall of Fame inductee Alydar. Her sire was Seattle Slew, the 1977 U.S. Triple Crown winner and a Hall of Fame inductee. After her fourth Grade I win, Lakeway ran second in the August 13, 1994 Alabama Stakes at Saratoga Race Course. Injured in the race, she did not return to racing for a full year. In her third race in 1995 she finished third in the October 28 Breeders' Cup Distaff then won the November 11 Grade II Churchill Downs Breeders' Cup Handicap.

Broodmare
Lakeway was retired to broodmare duty for owner Michael  Rutherford. The racing success of a daughter of Seattle Slew ensured that she would be bred to some of the best stallions or stallion prospects available.  However, her offspring from the likes of Giant's Causeway, Fusaichi Pegasus, Storm Cat, Seeking The Gold met with only modest success in racing.

References

1991 racehorse births
Thoroughbred family 9-f
Racehorses bred in Kentucky
Racehorses trained in the United States